Kanal 5 was launched on January 1, 2008 and was officially called the first Danish HDTV channel.
Kanal 5 is a Danish high-definition television channel from ProSiebenSat.1 Media AG. The channel broadcasts high-definition simulcasts of Kanal 5, showing material available in HD in true HD, and upscaling the rest of the content.

History
The channel was announced as the first national Danish HD channel on November 11, 2007.

Airing plans
Kanal 5 HD will show all self-produced material in HD. This includes the new sitcom Comedy Kuren.

Other series include:
 All obe
 Star
 the simpsons
CSI
CSI: Miami
CSI: NY
Criminal Minds
Numb3rs

Distribution
So far the channel is only available for subscribers of YouSee and Canal Digital.

External links
Official website

Television stations in Denmark
ProSiebenSat.1 Media

da:Kanal 5 HD